Fahprakorb Rakkiatgym (born; August 7, 1975 in Khon Kaen, Thailand) is a professional boxer from Thailand.

He was a former World Boxing Federation (WBF) World Champion in Junior featherweight division, and he had the opportunity to challenge the International Boxing Federation (IBF) World Champion twice but was unsuccessful. In the first challenge he lost to Manny Pacquiao by TKO in the first round at Rizal Memorial College, Davao City, the Philippines in 2002, and the second in 2006 when he lost to Valdemir Pereira by unanimous score at Foxwoods Resort Casino, state of Connecticut.

References
 Fahprakorb Rakkiatgym 

1975 births
Living people
Fahprakorb Rakkiatgym
Fahprakorb Rakkiatgym
Bantamweight boxers